This following article is a list of prominent members of the Lanka Sama Samaja Party.

Members of the Lanka Sama Samaja Party (LSSP), a Marxist, Trotskyist, socialist party in Sri Lanka. Some of the people listed below may only briefly have been in the LSSP.

A large proportion of the leadership of the Left in Sri Lanka started their political lives in the LSSP. This is even true of the political right; for example, Esmond Wickremesinghe (the father of Ranil Wickremasinghe) was a leading member of the party before he married the daughter of the wealthy press baron D.R Wijewardena and being appointed editor-in-chief of Lake House.

Founder Members 
 Colvin R de Silva
 Leslie Goonewardene
 Philip Gunawardena, later Viplavakari Lanka Sama Samaja Party, later Mahajana Eksath Peramuna
 N. M. Perera
 Selina Perera

Other Prominent Members 
 Tissa Abeysekara
 Hector Abhayavardhana
 S. C. C. Anthony Pillai (Toni)
 Seneka Bibile
 Mark Anthony Bracegirdle
 Doric de Souza
 Carlo Fonseka
 Cholomondeley Goonewardene, later Sri Lanka Sama Samaja Party later Sri Lanka Freedom Party
 Vivienne Goonewardena
 Robert Gunawardena, later Mahajana Eksath Peramuna
 Jeanne Hoban, later Sri Lanka Sama Samaja Party
 Osmund Jayaratne
 Siritunga Jayasuriya later Nava Sama Samaja Party, later United Socialist Party
 V. Karalasingham (Carlo)
 Wickremabahu Karunaratne, later Nava Sama Samaja Party
 Vijaya Kumaratunga, later Sri Lanka Freedom Party, later Sri Lanka Mahajana Party 
 M. G. Mendis
 Rhoda Miller de Silva
 Anil Moonesinghe, later Sri Lanka Sama Samaja Party later Sri Lanka Freedom Party 
 Wesley Muttiah, later Nava Sama Samaja Party
 Vasudeva Nanayakkara, later Nava Sama Samaja Party, later Democratic Left Front
 G. E. H. Perera
 G. P. Perera ('Elephant Perera')
 V. S. Rajah ('Raja sahodaraya' 1935-2000), Long standing member of Lanka Sama Samaja Party
 Edmund Samarakkody, later Lanka Sama Samaja Party (Revolutionary), later Revolutionary Workers Party
 Reginald Senanayake ('Reggie') 
 Wilfred Senanayake, later Sri Lanka Sama Samaja Party later Sri Lanka Freedom Party
 Regi Siriwardena (Hamid or Hameed)
 Bernard Soyza
 Kusala Abhayavardhana
 Tissa Vitharana
 Batty Weerakoon
 S. A. Wickramasinghe, later Communist Party of Sri Lanka
 I. J. Wickrema
 Percy Wickremasekera, later Sri Lanka Sama Samaja Party 
 D. G. William ('Galle Face William')
 P. D. Wimalasena (General Secretary of LSSP Trade Union Federation)
 Doreen Young Wickremasinghe, later Communist Party of Sri Lanka

 
Lists of Sri Lankan politicians